Eino is a Finnish and Estonian masculine given name.  The name is thought to be the Finnic form of the given name Henri.  Both Finnish and Estonian languages belong to the Finno-Ugric language group through their being Uralic languages.  Another possible origin of the name is the German Enewald (Aginwald).

People with the given name Eino include:
Eino Forsström (1889–1961), Finnish gymnast
Eino Friberg (1901–1995), Finnish-American writer
Eino Hanski (1928–2000), Swedish-Finnish-Russian-Karelian author, dramatist and sculptor
Eino Heino (1912–1975), Finnish cinematographer
Eino Rudolf Woldemar Holsti (1881–1945), Finnish politician, journalist and diplomat
Antti Eino Juntumaa (born 1959), Finnish boxer
Eino Jutikkala (1907–2006), Finnish historian
Eino Ilmari Juutilainen (1914–1999), Finnish Air Force fighter pilot
Eino Kaila (1890–1958), Finnish philosopher, critic and teacher
Eino Kuvaja (1906–1975), Finnish skier and military commander
Eino Kirjonen (1933–1988), Finnish ski jumper
Eino-Endel Laas (1915–2009), Estonian forest scientist
Eino Lehtinen (1900–2007), one of the last surviving veterans of the Finnish Civil War
Eino Leino (1878–1926), Finnish poet and journalist
Eino Leino (1891–1986), Finnish wrestler
Eino Luukkanen (1909–1964), Finnish fighter ace
Eino Oksanen (born 1931), Finnish marathon runner
Eino Olkinuora (1915–1941), Finnish cross country skier
Eino Viljami Panula (1911–1912), Finnish boy who died during the sinking of the RMS Titanic
Eino Penttilä (1906–1982), Finnish athlete
Eino Puri (born 1988), Estonian football player
Eino Purje (1900–1984), middle-distance runner
Eino Rahja (1885–1936), Finnish-Russian politician
Eino Railio (1886–1970), Finnish gymnast
Eino S. Repo (1919–2002), Finnish journalist and politician
Vilho Eino Ritola (1896–1982), Finnish long-distance runner
Eino Saastamoinen (1887–1946), Finnish gymnast
Eino Sandelin (1864–1937), Finnish sailor
Eino Soinio (1894–1973), Finnish football player
Kaarlo Eino Kyösti Soinio (1888–1960), Finnish gymnast and amateur football player
Eino William Swan (1903–1940; better known as Einar Aaron Swan), American musician, arranger and composer
Eino Tamberg (1930–2010), Estonian composer
Eino Matti Toppinen (born 1975; better known as Eicca Toppinen), Finnish cellist, songwriter, producer and arranger
Eino Uusitalo (1924–2015), Finnish politician
Eino Virtanen (1908–1980), Finnish wrestler

References

Uralic personal names
Estonian masculine given names
Finnish masculine given names